A rechargeable calling card or a recharge card is a type of telephone card that the user can "recharge"  or "top up" by adding money when the balance gets below a nominated amount. In reality the rechargeable calling card is a specialised form of a prepaid or debit account.

To use the phonecard, the user would call an access number (which is usually a toll-free telephone number), enter the "card number" (also called the PIN) and then dial the desired telephone number. The user could add value to the card at the same time as making a call. When travelling, the user has a list of access numbers for various countries, enabling them to call from any phone in most countries and be able to top-up the card.

The so-called rechargeable calling card is merely a marketing device, but it is convenient to many users because it is a durable credit card size card. In reality, the system works by a user being provided with a unique "card ID" (the PIN). After transferring funds to the card company, the ID can be provided electronically by email, by SMS, over the internet, a coupon printed by a cash register at a store, or any other way. Also, as the card balance is actually recorded on the card company's database, topping up can be effected in any manner that funds can be transferred to the company.

History
Calling cards were introduced in Italy in 1977 and became especially popular in Japan when they were introduced there in 1982. These cards had a set value that could be spent and, once the credit was used, the card would be discarded. Calling cards began to gain popularity around the world and they turned into a multimillion-dollar industry.

In an attempt to improve the phonecard, companies started issuing rechargeable calling cards in the early 1990s, also obtainable over the internet, which became the most common phonecard on the market.

Recharging
Cards can be recharged or topped up in a variety of ways:

 Credit card
 Cash at convenience stores/corner shops
 Swipe card machines
 Internet
 Coupons
 Bank account
 Debit card

Japan 
Even though the calling card was first introduced in Italy the country that took to the calling card most was Japan, where calling cards were introduced in 1982 by Nippon Telegraph and Telephone (NTT). It was an instant hit, selling thousands a day on the subway systems in Tokyo and Osaka, various other companies began to get involved and released their own variants. In 2000, Brastel Telecom released the first rechargeable phone card in Japan called Brastel Card; this time the card was sold in convenience stores across Japan.  As the rechargeable phone card took off, more companies began to release cards.

A cardless future 
As international travel became cheaper and more people started to travel the international phone card became an essential part of a travelers` itinerary, previously customers would have to carry one or more cards when traveling and the cards could only be used in certain phones.  Phone companies such as Pure Minutes began to release "cardless" phone cards, instead of being issued with a real card, the user will be given a list of access numbers for various countries and a pin which they can use to log into their account.  This allowed people to call from any phone in any country and still be able to top-up their credit.

Sources 
Chicago Tribune 1995 Calling Cards
Newspaper Article about Rechargeable Calling Cards
College Article
Buzzle Article Detailing the Rechargeable Calling Card

References 

Telephone services
Telecommunications economics